Artois may refer to:

Places
Artois, former province in northern France
County of Artois, Carolingian county in Western Francia
Counts of Artois, rulers of the County of Artois
Battle of Artois (disambiguation), several battles fought during the First World War
Agglomeration community of Artois, administrative entity in the Pas-de-Calais département
Artois, California, unincorporated community in the United States

Beer
Stella Artois, lager beer
Peeterman Artois, a wheat-based lager
Artois Bock, specialty beer

People
Charles X of France (1757-1836), formerly comte d'Artois
Guy D'Artois (born 1917), Canadian Army officer and SOE agent during World War II

Other
Artois (cloak), a long cloak worn by women in the 18th century
Artois Hound, breed of dog
HMS Artois, ships of the Royal Navy